A chi-squared test (also chi-square or  test) is a statistical hypothesis test used in the analysis of contingency tables when the sample sizes are large. In simpler terms, this test is primarily used to examine whether two categorical variables (two dimensions of the contingency table) are independent in influencing the test statistic (values within the table). The test is valid when the test statistic is chi-squared distributed under the null hypothesis, specifically Pearson's chi-squared test and variants thereof. Pearson's chi-squared test is used to determine whether there is a statistically significant difference between the expected frequencies and the observed frequencies in one or more categories of a contingency table. For contingency tables with smaller sample sizes, a Fisher's exact test is used instead. 

In the standard applications of this test, the observations are classified into mutually exclusive classes. If the null hypothesis that there are no differences between the classes in the population is true, the test statistic computed from the observations follows a  frequency distribution. The purpose of the test is to evaluate how likely the observed frequencies would be assuming the null hypothesis is true.

Test statistics that follow a  distribution occur when the observations are independent. There are also  tests for testing the null hypothesis of independence of a pair of random variables based on observations of the pairs.

Chi-squared tests often refers to tests for which the distribution of the test statistic approaches the  distribution asymptotically, meaning that the sampling distribution (if the null hypothesis is true) of the test statistic approximates a chi-squared distribution more and more closely as sample sizes increase.

History 
In the 19th century, statistical analytical methods were mainly applied in biological data analysis and it was customary for researchers to assume that observations followed a normal distribution, such as Sir George Airy and Mansfield Merriman, whose works were criticized by Karl Pearson in his 1900 paper.

At the end of the 19th century, Pearson noticed the existence of significant skewness within some biological observations. In order to model the observations regardless of being normal or skewed, Pearson, in a series of articles published from 1893 to 1916, devised the Pearson distribution, a family of continuous probability distributions, which includes the normal distribution and many skewed distributions, and proposed a method of statistical analysis consisting of using the Pearson distribution to model the observation and performing a test of goodness of fit to determine how well the model really fits to the observations.

Pearson's chi-squared test 

In 1900, Pearson published a paper on the  test which is considered to be one of the foundations of modern statistics. In this paper, Pearson investigated a test of goodness of fit.

Suppose that  observations in a random sample from a population are classified into  mutually exclusive classes with respective observed numbers  (for ), and a null hypothesis gives the probability  that an observation falls into the th class. So we have the expected numbers  for all , where

Pearson proposed that, under the circumstance of the null hypothesis being correct, as  the limiting distribution of the quantity given below is the  distribution.

Pearson dealt first with the case in which the expected numbers  are large enough known numbers in all cells assuming every  may be taken as normally distributed, and reached the result that, in the limit as  becomes large,  follows the  distribution with  degrees of freedom.

However, Pearson next considered the case in which the expected numbers depended on the parameters that had to be estimated from the sample, and suggested that, with the notation of  being the true expected numbers and  being the estimated expected numbers, the difference

will usually be positive and small enough to be omitted. In a conclusion, Pearson argued that if we regarded  as also distributed as  distribution with  degrees of freedom, the error in this approximation would not affect practical decisions. This conclusion caused some controversy in practical applications and was not settled for 20 years until Fisher's 1922 and 1924 papers.

Other examples of chi-squared tests 

One test statistic that follows a chi-squared distribution exactly is the test that the variance of a normally distributed population has a given value based on a sample variance. Such tests are uncommon in practice because the true variance of the population is usually unknown. However, there are several statistical tests where the chi-squared distribution is approximately valid:

Fisher's exact test 
For an exact test used in place of the 2 × 2 chi-squared test for independence, see Fisher's exact test.

Binomial test 
For an exact test used in place of the 2 × 1 chi-squared test for goodness of fit, see binomial test.

Other chi-squared tests 
 Cochran–Mantel–Haenszel chi-squared test.
 McNemar's test, used in certain  tables with pairing
 Tukey's test of additivity
 The portmanteau test in time-series analysis, testing for the presence of autocorrelation
 Likelihood-ratio tests in general statistical modelling, for testing whether there is evidence of the need to move from a simple model to a more complicated one (where the simple model is nested within the complicated one).

Yates's correction for continuity 

Using the chi-squared distribution to interpret Pearson's chi-squared statistic requires one to assume that the discrete probability of observed binomial frequencies in the table can be approximated by the continuous chi-squared distribution. This assumption is not quite correct and introduces some error.

To reduce the error in approximation, Frank Yates suggested a correction for continuity that adjusts the formula for Pearson's chi-squared test by subtracting 0.5 from the absolute difference between each observed value and its expected value in a  contingency table. This reduces the chi-squared value obtained and thus increases its p-value.

Chi-squared test for variance in a normal population
If a sample of size  is taken from a population having a normal distribution, then there is a result (see distribution of the sample variance) which allows a test to be made of whether the variance of the population has a pre-determined value. For example, a manufacturing process might have been in stable condition for a long period, allowing a value for the variance to be determined essentially without error. Suppose that a variant of the process is being tested, giving rise to a small sample of  product items whose variation is to be tested. The test statistic  in this instance could be set to be the sum of squares about the sample mean, divided by the nominal value for the variance (i.e. the value to be tested as holding). Then  has a chi-squared distribution with  degrees of freedom.

Example chi-squared test for categorical data

A random sample of 650 residents of the city is taken and their occupation is recorded as "white collar", "blue collar", or "no collar". The null hypothesis is that each person's neighborhood of residence is independent of the person's occupational classification. The data are tabulated as:

{| class="wikitable" style="text-align: right;"
|-
! !!  !!  !!  !!  !! Total
|-
|style="text-align: left;"| White collar || 90 || 60 || 104 || 95 || 349 
|-
|style="text-align: left;"| Blue collar || 30 || 50 || 51 || 20 || 151
|-
|style="text-align: left;"| No collar || 30 || 40 || 45 || 35 || 150
|-
!style="text-align: left;"| Total || 150 || 150 || 200 || 150 || 650
|}

Let us take the sample living in neighborhood , 150, to estimate what proportion of the whole 1,000,000 live in neighborhood . Similarly we take  to estimate what proportion of the 1,000,000 are white-collar workers. By the assumption of independence under the hypothesis we should "expect" the number of white-collar workers in neighborhood  to be

 

Then in that "cell" of the table, we have

 

The sum of these quantities over all of the cells is the test statistic; in this case, . Under the null hypothesis, this sum has approximately a chi-squared distribution whose number of degrees of freedom is

 

If the test statistic is improbably large according to that chi-squared distribution, then one rejects the null hypothesis of independence.

A related issue is a test of homogeneity. Suppose that instead of giving every resident of each of the four neighborhoods an equal chance of inclusion in the sample, we decide in advance how many residents of each neighborhood to include. Then each resident has the same chance of being chosen as do all residents of the same neighborhood, but residents of different neighborhoods would have different probabilities of being chosen if the four sample sizes are not proportional to the populations of the four neighborhoods. In such a case, we would be testing "homogeneity" rather than "independence". The question is whether the proportions of blue-collar, white-collar, and no-collar workers in the four neighborhoods are the same. However, the test is done in the same way.

Applications

In cryptanalysis, the chi-squared test is used to compare the distribution of plaintext and (possibly) decrypted ciphertext. The lowest value of the test means that the decryption was successful with high probability. This method can be generalized for solving modern cryptographic problems.

In bioinformatics, the chi-squared test is used to compare the distribution of certain properties of genes (e.g., genomic content, mutation rate, interaction network clustering, etc.) belonging to different categories (e.g., disease genes, essential genes, genes on a certain chromosome etc.).

See also

 Chi-squared test nomogram
 GEH statistic
 G-test
 Minimum chi-square estimation
 Nonparametric statistics
 Wald test
 Wilson score interval

References

Further reading
 
 
 
 
 

Statistical tests for contingency tables
Nonparametric statistics